Piranshahr and Sardasht (electoral district) is the 4th electoral district in the West Azerbaijan Province of Iran.  It has a population of 235,229 and elects 1 member of parliament.

1980
MP in 1980 from the electorate of Piranshahr and Sardasht. (1st)
 Ahmad Alipour

1984
MP in 1984 from the electorate of Piranshahr and Sardasht. (2nd)
 Mostafa Ghaderi

1988
MP in 1988 from the electorate of Piranshahr and Sardasht. (3rd)
 Ghader Sharifzadeh

1992
MP in 1992 from the electorate of Piranshahr and Sardasht. (4th)
 Mohammad Karimian

1996
MP in 1996 from the electorate of Piranshahr and Sardasht. (5th)
 Mohammad Karimian

2000
MP in 2000 from the electorate of Piranshahr and Sardasht. (6th)
 Hasel Daseh

2004
MP in 2004 from the electorate of Piranshahr and Sardasht. (7th)
 Mohammad Karimian

2008
MP in 2008 from the electorate of Piranshahr and Sardasht. (8th)
 Mohammad Ali Partovi

2012
MP in 2012 from the electorate of Piranshahr and Sardasht. (9th)
 Rasoul Khezri

2016

Notes

References

Electoral districts of West Azerbaijan
Sardasht County
Piranshahr County